The Health Act 2009 (c 21) is an Act of the Parliament of the United Kingdom. It implements those parts of the NHS Next Stage Review that require primary legislation.

Section 40 - Commencement
The powers conferred by this section have been exercised by the following Orders:
The Health Act 2009 (Commencement No. 1) Order 2010 (S.I. 2010/30 (C. 5))
The Health Act 2009 (Commencement No. 2) Order 2010 (S.I. 2010/779 (C. 52))
The Health Act 2009 (Commencement No. 3) Order 2010 (S.I. 2010/1068 (C. 70))
The Health Act 2009 (Commencement No. 3) (Amendment) Order 2011 (S.I. 2011/1255 (C. 49))
The Health Act 2009 (Commencement No. 4) Order 2010 (S.I. 2010/1863 (C. 95))
The Health Act 2009 (Commencement No. 1) (Wales) Order 2010 (S.I. 2010/930 (W. 95) (C. 63))

References
Halsbury's Statutes,

External links
The Health Act 2009, as amended from the National Archives.
The Health Act 2009, as originally enacted from the National Archives.
Explanatory notes to the Health Act 2009.

United Kingdom Acts of Parliament 2009